Diego Junqueira and Brian Dabul were the defending champions but decided not to participate.
Carlos Berlocq and Eduardo Schwank won the title, defeating Marcel Felder and Jaroslav Pospíšil 6–7(1–7), 6–4, [10–7] in the final.

Seeds

Draw

Draw

References
 Main Draw

Copa Topper - Doubles
2011 Doubles